The Tuanku Ja'afar Royal Gallery is a gallery in Seremban, Negeri Sembilan, Malaysia. The gallery is about the former Negeri Sembilan Yang di-Pertuan Besar Tuanku Ja'afar.

History
The gallery building started its construction on 2 May 2012 and completed in 2013. The first phase of the gallery was opened on 4 December 2014 by Tunku Ampuan Besar of Negeri Sembilan Tuanku Najihah.

Architecture
The building has a concept of modern colonial architecture. The gallery is housed in a three-story building with an area of 4,087 m2 and divided into 9 exhibition halls. Six exhibitions hall are available for visitor viewing while another three halls are still under construction, which are: 
 Introduction of Negeri Sembilan
 Getting to Know His Excellency
 Growing Up Period
 Early Works
 The 10th Yang di-Pertuan Besar of Negeri Sembilan
 The 19th Yang di-Pertuan Agong of Malaysia

Exhibitions
The gallery exhibits the private collections and life of Tuanku Ja'afar.

Transportation
The gallery is within walking distance north east of Seremban railway station.

See also
 List of tourist attractions in Negeri Sembilan
 Yamtuan Besar

References

External links

  

2014 establishments in Malaysia
Art museums and galleries in Malaysia
Buildings and structures in Negeri Sembilan
Museums established in 2014
Tourist attractions in Negeri Sembilan